Písek is a town in Písek District, South Bohemian Region, Czech Republic.

Písek or Pisek may also refer to:
Písek (Frýdek-Místek District), a municipality and village in the Moravian-Silesian Region, Czech Republic
Písek (Hradec Králové District), a municipality and village in the Hradec Králové Region, Czech Republic
Pisek, North Dakota, a city in Walsh County, North Dakota, U.S.
Pisek, Texas, a ghost town in Colorado County, Texas, U.S.